James Leon Pense (February 5, 1922 – January 22, 2015) was an American football blocking back who played one season with the Pittsburgh Steelers. He played college football at the University of Arkansas and attended Bartlesville High School in Bartlesville, Oklahoma.

References

2015 deaths
1922 births
American football running backs
Arkansas Razorbacks football players
Pittsburgh Steelers players
Players of American football from Oklahoma
People from Adair County, Oklahoma